Fernando Luiz Lara is a Brazilian-born architect, academic, and author.

Biography
Born in Brazil, Lara studied at Federal University of Minas Gerais and graduated with Bachelor of Architecture in 1993. He continued his education at Federal University of Minas Gerais and completed Master of Science in 1996. He completed his PhD from the University of Michigan in 2001.

In 2008, his book, The Rise of Popular Modernist Architecture in Brazil, was published. The book was reviewed by Adrian Forty in the Journal of the Society of Architectural Historians.

In 2015, he published, Modern Architecture in Latin America, the first survey to address the region. The book was reviewed in multiple journals, including The Hispanic American Historical Review, Bitacora, Architectural Record, and others.

Between 2012 and 2015, Lara was chair of the Brazil Center at the Lozano Long Institute of Latin American Studies.

In 2018, Lara became the director of University of Texas at Austin School of Architecture's doctoral program in architecture. He is currently the Potter Rose Professor in Urban Planning at the University of Texas at Austin School of Architecture.

His work was exhibited at the São Paulo Bienalle of Architecture and the Kubitschek Museum.

Bibliography

Books written
 The Rise of Popular Modernist Architecture in Brazil (2008)
 Latitudes II (2014)
 Modern Architecture in Latin America: Art, Technology and Utopia, with Luis Carranza, (2015)
 Excepcionalidade do Modernismo Brasileiro (2018)
 Street Matters, A Critical History of Twentieth-Century Urban Policy in Brazil (2022)

Books edited
 Latin America: Thoughs, Nhamerica Platform/Romano Guerra Editora
 Lelé: dialogues with neutra and prouvé
 Critical Readings
 Architecture and Nature by Abilio Guerra
 Ode to the Void by Carlos Teixeira
 Risky Spaces by Otávio Leonídio

Monographs
 Boldarini e Associados (2019)
 Arquitetos Associados (2017)
 Horizontes (2017)

References

Living people
21st-century Brazilian writers
Brazilian architects
University of Michigan alumni
University of Michigan faculty
Federal University of Minas Gerais alumni
Year of birth missing (living people)